Vulcaniella fiordalisa is a moth of the family Cosmopterigidae. It is found from Portugal and Morocco, east to the Balkan Peninsula and Lebanon.

The wingspan is 7–9 mm. Adults are on wing from May to August.

The larvae feed on various Asteraceae species, including Helichrysum serotinum, Helichrysum angustifolium, Helichrysum stoechas and Phagnalon species. They mine the leaves of their host plant. The mine consists of a blotch inside of the mine covered with silk. Pupation takes place within the mine, without a recognisable cocoon.

External links
bladmineerders.nl
Fauna Europaea

Vulcaniella
Moths of Europe
Moths of Asia
Moths described in 1904